Claire Kelly (March 15, 1934 – July 1, 1998) was an American actress and model.

Early life
Born Claire Ann Green, the daughter of a wealthy California rancher, she was trained at the Neighborhood Playhouse in New York.

Kelly started out as a model in Miami, and appeared several times on the cover of McCall's, continuing her modelling career throughout the 1950s. She made the cover of Picture Week in 1956, and was a 1958 Deb Star.

Career
Kelly went on to roles in films such as The Badlanders (1958), Party Girl (1958), Ask Any Girl (1959), and A Guide for the Married Man (1967). In The Badlanders, a Western remake of the film noir The Asphalt Jungle, she played "the Angela role immortalized by Marilyn Monroe"  in the original film. In 1959, she was publicized as "the screen's most exciting discovery since Rita Hayworth". In 1964-65, she appeared in several episodes of the television series Burke's Law.

Personal life
From 1951 to 1955, Kelly was married to singer-comedian George DeWitt. She was credited as Claire DeWitt in Son of Sinbad. They had a son, Nicholas.

On November 6, 1954, Kelly's three-year-old son, Nicholas Christopher DeWitt, died after fighting for three days in an iron lung at Variety Children's Hospital in Miami, Florida, the victim of a rare anesthetic hazard, which happened after he was bitten on the lip by Duke, a cocker spaniel owned by former featherweight champion Willie Pep, and his heart stopped beating as doctors repaired the damage with 25 stitches.

On March 27, 1960, she married actor Perry Lopez in North Hollywood. After they divorced, she married banking heir Robert Alan Kenaston, son of actress Billie Dove, on October 21, 1961, in Juarez, Mexico. They had a son, Robert Burns Kenaston. They divorced on July 22, 1963. She later married Robert Murphy, and was married to him until her death.

She once dismissed Prince Aly Khan as "gauche" and Elvis Presley as "a mere child".

Filmography

Film

Television

References

External links
 

1934 births
1998 deaths
American film actresses
Actresses from San Francisco
20th-century American actresses